Mohammed Al-Rashid (born June 14, 1980) is a Saudi Arabian footballer, playing for Al-Sahel FC. He plays as centre forward, He played for Al-Ettifaq, moved to Al-Ittihad in loan on 2010-11. He signed a contract for 10 million SR. In his First season with Al-Ittihad he scored 14 goals.

References

1980 births
Living people
People from Dammam
Saudi Arabian footballers
Saudi Arabia international footballers
Ittihad FC players
Al-Taawoun FC players
Ettifaq FC players
Hajer FC players
Khaleej FC players
Al-Tai FC players
Al-Sahel SC (Saudi Arabia) players
Saudi First Division League players
Saudi Professional League players
Saudi Second Division players
Saudi Fourth Division players
Association football forwards